Celaenorrhinus handmani is a species of butterfly in the family Hesperiidae. It is found in southern Kenya, Tanzania, Malawi and Zambia. The habitat consists of forests.

References

Butterflies described in 1998
handmani